James Six FRS (1731 – 25 August 1793) was a British scientist born in Canterbury. He is noted for his invention, in 1780, of Six's thermometer, commonly known as the maximum- minimum thermometer. This device is still in common use today and widely sold in garden centres.

Life
Six was from a family of refugees from the Continent who had settled in England in the reign of Queen Elizabeth I, and who had worked as silk weavers for generations. James Six himself had trained in the family business, but by his time this was in decline because of cheap imported silks from India and Persia.

He became interested in natural philosophy, and devoted himself to astronomy and meteorology. In 1782 The Royal Society of London published an account of the thermometer that Six had invented two years earlier. In 1784, Six was elected a member of the American Philosophical Society in Philadelphia. He became a Fellow of the Royal Society in 1792, his election was the result of this and other papers he had published on meteorology.

In 1783 he performed a number of thermometrical measurements on Canterbury cathedral in conjunction with Sir John Cullum, who wrote about them for Philosophical Transactions in “Account of extraordinary Frost, 23 June 1783”, (Philosophical Transactions, lxxiv (1784)).

Six wrote about his invention in his book, The Construction and Use of a Thermometer for Showing the Extremes of Temperature in the Atmosphere, during the Observer's Absence, together with Experiments and Variations of Local Heat; and other Meteorological Observations. This was published posthumously in London, in 1794, a year after he died.

James Six died on 25 August 1793 at the age of sixty-two. His wife Mary died on 19 March 1801 and they are buried together in a vault in Westgate Church, Canterbury.

References

 The Construction of a Thermometer by James Six, Nimbus Publishing Ltd,1980; 
 James Six at the Institute and Museum of the History of Science
 
 Two Hundred Years of the Six's Self-Registering Thermometer Jillian F. Austin and Anita McConnell. Notes and Records of the Royal Society of London, Vol. 35, No. 1 (Jul., 1980), pp. 49–65   (article consists of 17 pages) Published by: The Royal Society, London. (Copy at JSTOR)
British History Online Canterbury - the churches within the city and suburbs. See section on Westgate Church. Accessed May 2008

1731 births
1793 deaths
People from Canterbury
English meteorologists
English inventors
Fellows of the Royal Society